Ben Shephard (born 1974) is an English television presenter and journalist.

Ben Shephard, Ben Shepherd, Ben Shepard or Ben Sheppard may also refer to:

People 
 Ben Shepard (musician), founder of American indie rock band Uzi and Ari
 Ben Shephard (historian) (1948–2017), British historian
 Ben Shepherd (born 1968), American musician
 Ben H. Shepherd, British historian of World War II
 Ben Sheppard (1890-1931), Australian sportsman

Other uses 
 Ben Sheppard Elementary, a Miami-Dade County Public School, Florida, U.S